The 2001 World Junior Wrestling Championships were the 27th edition of the World Junior Wrestling Championships and  were held in the Greco-Romane and the men's Freestyle style in Tashkent, and the women's freestyle in Martigny.

Medal table

Medal summary

Men's freestyle

Greco-Roman

Women's freestyle

References

External links 
 UWW Database

World Junior Championships
Wrestling Championships
International wrestling competitions hosted by Uzbekistan
Wrestling in Uzbekistan
World Junior Wrestling Championships
Sports competitions in Tashkent
International wrestling competitions hosted by Switzerland
Wrestling in Switzerland